Josiah Leeds Kerr (January 10, 1861 – September 27, 1920) represented Maryland's 1st congressional district in the United States House of Representatives from 1900 to 1901.

Kerr was born in Vienna, Maryland. He moved to Crisfield, Maryland, in 1880, and entered the employ of a lumber company as clerk.  He then moved to Cambridge, Maryland, in 1885, and was elected school examiner in August 1898, serving two years.

Kerr was elected as a Republican to Congress from Maryland's 1st congressional district to fill the vacancy caused by the resignation of John Walter Smith and served the remainder of Smith's term from November 6, 1900, to March 3, 1901, but was not a candidate for renomination in 1900.  He returned to Cambridge, and became a traveling salesman.  He died in Cambridge, and is interred in Christ Episcopal Church Cemetery.

References

1861 births
1920 deaths
People from Dorchester County, Maryland
Republican Party members of the United States House of Representatives from Maryland
People from Crisfield, Maryland
People from Cambridge, Maryland